In 1884, a statue of Christopher Columbus was installed in St. Louis, Missouri, United States. The dedication inscription on its base read: “The XIX Centurÿ to Christopher Columbus 1884.”

The monument was removed in June 2020.

See also

 List of monuments and memorials removed during the George Floyd protests
 List of monuments and memorials to Christopher Columbus

References

Buildings and structures in St. Louis
Monuments and memorials in Missouri
Monuments and memorials removed during the George Floyd protests
Monuments and memorials to Christopher Columbus
Outdoor sculptures in Missouri
Relocated buildings and structures in Missouri
Sculptures of men in Missouri
St. Louis
Former buildings and structures in St. Louis
Statues removed in 2020